Bill Anderson's Greatest Hits, Vol. 2 is a compilation album by American country singer-songwriter Bill Anderson. It was released in September 1971 on Decca Records and was produced by Owen Bradley. The record was Anderson's fourth compilation released in his recording career and contained one single that became a major hit in 1971. The album itself included some his biggest hits from the era.

Background and content
Bill Anderson's Greatest Hits, Vol. 2 was Anderson's second greatest hits album package released at the Decca label. The sessions were all produced by Owen Bradley, whom was his long time producer at the label. A total of 11 tracks were included on the album package. The songs chosen were recorded and had mostly been hits for Anderson between 1967 and 1971. These songs included the number one hit "My Life (Throw It Away If I Want To)" and the top five hits "Wild Week-End," "Happy State of Mind," "Get While the Gettin's Good" and "Love Is a Sometimes Thing." One new track was included called "Quits." It served as the album's opening tune.

Release
Bill Anderson's Greatest Hits, Vol. 2 was released in September 1971 on Decca Records. It became Anderson's fourth compilation effort released in his recording career. His first was issued in 1962. The record was issued as a vinyl LP, containing six songs on side one and five songs on side two. The record spent a total of 15 weeks on the Billboard Top Country Albums before peaking at number 18 in January 1972. Unlike his previous compilation, the album spawned one new track as a single to radio. The lead track "Quits" was issued as a single release in July 1971. Spending 17 weeks on the Billboard Hot Country Singles chart, "Quits" peaked at number three in September 1971. The single also became a major hit in Canada, reaching number two on the RPM Country Songs chart.

Track listing

Personnel
All credits are adapted from the liner notes of Bill Anderson's Greatest Hits, Vol. 2.

Musical and technical personnel
 Bill Anderson – lead vocals
 Owen Bradley – producer
 Hal Buksbaum – cover photo

Chart performance

Release history

References

1971 greatest hits albums
Albums produced by Owen Bradley
Bill Anderson (singer) compilation albums
Decca Records albums